Simon Musk (born 7 January 1985) is an English professional wrestler better known under his in-ring persona of masked Mexican luchador, El Ligero (or simply Ligero). He is most known for his time in WWE, on their NXT UK brand.

Professional wrestling career

Independent circuit (2002–2018)
El Ligero has been a professional wrestler since February 2002. 

In 2010, El Ligero appeared for Insane Championship Wrestling, entering a tournament to become the inaugural ICW Zero-G Champion but was unsuccessful.

On 20 October 2016, it was announced that Ligero would take part at the taping of the British professional wrestling promotion World of Sport Wrestling. He only made one appearance for World of Sport, on the inaugural show on 1 November 2016, where he won a singles match against Zack Gibson and later that night competed in a battle royal.

Pro Wrestling Noah (2008)
On 21 June 2008, El Ligero took part in an exclusive British six-man tag team match, on the pre-show of Pro Wrestling Noah's UK event at the Coventry Skydome. The team of Hubba-Bubba Lucha (El Ligero and Bubblegum) along with Luke "Dragon" Phoenix defeated Zack Sabre Jr., Dave Moralez and Mark Haskins.

Preston City Wrestling (2011–2016)
In August 2011, Ligero appeared on the inaugural Preston City Wrestling (PCW) card, beating Prince Ameen in a first round match in the PCW title tournament. Later that night, a storyline injury caused by Lionheart and Noam Dar took him out of the second show and the rest of the tournament, his place being taken by Kris Travis. Ligero would continue to make appearances in PCW over the next several years. His run there included a singles match against future WWE star Akira Tozawa on 2 June 2012, which Ligero won.

On 31 October 2015 at Fright Night 4, Ligero defeated Bubblegum for the PCW Cruiserweight title. He lost the belt a month later on 27 November 2015 at Supershow of Honor 2 – Show 1 to Adam Cole in an elimination 3-way match which also featured Bubblegum. He subsequently failed to regain the title from Bubblegum in a four way dance also including Danny Hope and Joey Hayes, and left the promotion shortly afterwards.

Progress Wrestling (2012–2019)
Ligero appeared on the debut show for England-based promotion Progress Wrestling and spent the first four events pursuing the Progress Champion, Nathan Cruz. Ligero eventually won the title at Chapter Four: the Ballad of El Ligero in November 2012. He dropped the title to Rampage Brown at Chapter Eight and disappeared from the promotion. He would make sporadic returns through 2019.

WWE (2018–2020)
On 16 May 2018 it was revealed that El Ligero, wrestling under the ring name Ligero, would be one of 16 men competing in a one-night tournament to face Pete Dunne for the WWE United Kingdom Championship. He would lose to Travis Banks in the first round. Over Instagram, Ligero revealed he signed a UK deal with WWE. On 24 October edition of NXT UK, he would take on "Wild Boar" Mike Hitchman in a winning effort. At the January 2019 tapings, he won both his matches, one of which was against Mark Andrews. At the February tapings Ligero defeated Joseph Conners. At the WWE Worlds Collide that was filmed over WrestleMania 35 weekend, he defeated NXT's Albert Hardie Jr. and 205 Live's Gran Metalik in a triple threat match. On 14 May, he debuted on the Cruiserweight brand 205 Live, in a match against WWE Cruiserweight Champion Tony Nese. He would lose the match, and be attacked by Nese's rival Ariya Daivari after the match.

Sexual assault allegations

As part of the Speaking Out movement, Ligero was accused of indecent assault, sending inappropriate messages, and engaging in inappropriate conduct. While he denied the indecent assault allegation, he admitted that he did send inappropriate messages and engaged in inappropriate conduct. Following the allegations, Ligero would be released by Progress Wrestling and WWE.

Championships and accomplishments
3 Count Wrestling
3CW Triple Crown Championship (2 times)
4 Front Wrestling
4 Front Wrestling Heavyweight Championship (1 time)
Anglian Championship Wrestling
ACW Light Heavyweight Championship (1 time)
Attack! Pro Wrestling
Kris Travis Tag Team Invitational 2017 Tournament – with Martin Kirby
British Hybrid Wrestling
BHW Championship (1 time)
British Real Attitude Wrestling League
BRAWL Cruiserweight Championship (1 time)
Frontier Championship Wrestling
FCW Championship (1 time)
Gerry Norton Promotions
GNP Tag Team Championship (1 time) – with Cameron Kraze
Grand Pro Wrestling
GPW British Championship (1 time)
Crazy Cruiser 8 (2013)
HOPE Wrestling
HOPE Kings Of Flight Championship (3 times)
Infinite Promotions
Infinite Promotions Tag Team Championship (1 time) – with Bubblegum
Infinite Promotions Tag Team Championship Tournament (2014) – with Bubblegum
New Breed Wrestling Association
NBWA Heavyweight Championship (1 time)
New Generation Wrestling
NGW Undisputed Championship (1 time) 
NGW Tag Team Championship (1 time) – with Dara Diablo
NGW Tag Team Championship Tournament (2011) – with Dara Diablo
Winner of the Goole Trophy (1 time)
North East Wrestling Society
NEWS British Championship (1 time)
NEWS British Championship Tournament
Northern Wrestling League
NWL Elite Tag Team Championship (1 time) – with Bubblegum
Norton British Wrestling
NBW Cruiserweight Championship (1 time)
One Pro Wrestling
1PW Tag Team Championship (1 time) – with Bubblegum
Premier British Wrestling
PBW Heavyweight Championship (1 time)
King of Cruisers (2010)
Preston City Wrestling
PCW Cruiserweight Championship (1 time)
Phoenix Pro Wrestling
PPW Championship (1 time)
PPW Championship Tournament (2011)
Power Trip Wrestling
PTW Heavyweight Championship (1 time)
Progress Wrestling
Progress Championship (1 time)
Progress Tag Team Championship (2 times) – with Nathan Cruz, Danny Garnell & Damon Moser (1) and Nathan Cruz (1)
Pro Wrestling Chaos
Knights Of Chaos Championship (1 time) – with Martin Kirby
Pro Wrestling Illustrated
Ranked No. 235 of the top 500 singles wrestlers in the PWI 500 in 2018
Real Deal Wrestling
RDW European Championship (1 time)
RDW Lightweight Championship (1 time)
RDW Lincolnshire Regional Championship (1 time)
RDW Tag Team Championship (1 time) – with Martin Kirby
Blitz League (2008)
Money in the Bank (2008)
SAS Wrestling
SAS Tag Team Championship (1 time) – with Bubblegum
Southside Wrestling Entertainment
SWE Heavyweight Championship (1 time)
SWE Speed King Championship (1 time)
SWE Tag Team Championship (1 time) – with Joseph Conners
Speed King (2015)
Swiss Wrestling Entertainment
SWE Championship (1 time)
Tidal Championship Wrestling
TCW Championship (2 times)
Triple X Wrestling
TWX Ax Championship (1 time)
TWX Crush Championship (1 time)
What Culture Pro Wrestling
WCPW Internet Championship (1 time, inaugural)
Magnificent 7 (2017) Briefecase1
WrestlingKULT
International Cult Cup Championship (1 time)
X Wrestling Alliance
XWA Flyweight Championship (3 times)

1Defeated Martin Kirby at Build to Destroy (2017) to win the Magnificent 7 (2017) Briefcase.

Luchas de Apuestas record

References

External links

An Exclusive Interview with 'Mexican Dragon' El Ligero

1985 births
21st-century professional wrestlers
English male professional wrestlers
Living people
Masked wrestlers
Martial artists from Leeds
PROGRESS World Champions
PROGRESS Tag Team Champions